PGL Major: Kraków 2017, also known as PGL Major 2017 or Kraków 2017, was the eleventh Counter-Strike: Global Offensive Major Championship. It is the first Major organized by the Romanian organization PGL and it was held in Kraków, Poland from July 16 to 23, 2017. It featured sixteen professional CS:GO teams from around the world. Eight teams qualified directly based on their top eight placement in the previous Major, ELEAGUE Major 2017, while another eight teams qualified through the Offline Major Qualifier. The PGL Major was the fourth consecutive major with a prize pool of 1,000,000.

The playoffs consisted of eight teams. Astralis, Fnatic, Gambit Esports, North, SK Gaming, and Virtus.pro were returning Legends while BIG and Immortals were new Legends. FaZe Clan and Natus Vincere lost their Legends status after failing to advance from the group stage. The grand finals featured two underdogs: Gambit Esports, which defeated Fnatic and Astralis, and Immortals, which defeated BIG and Virtus.pro. The Major concluded with Gambit defeating Immortals 2–1 in a relatively close best-of-three series, marking just the third time a non-European team won a Major (the Brazilian Luminosity/SK roster won two Majors) and the first time an Asian team won a Major.

Format
The format remained the same as the previous Major. The top eight teams from Atlanta 2017 ("Legends") were automatically invited to Kraków 2017. The remaining eight spots were filled by teams that advanced from the PGL Major Krakow 2017 Main Qualifier. The Krakow 2017 Main Qualifier was a 16-team Swiss-system tournament consisting of the bottom eight teams from Atlanta 2017, as well as eight teams promoted from four regional qualifiers. The top eight teams at the Main Qualifier, teams with three wins, then advanced to the Major as the "Challengers".

The group stage of the Major was also a 16-team Swiss-system group stage. The top eight teams at the end of the group stage, teams with three wins, advanced to the playoff stage and became the new Legends. Teams with three losses were eliminated, but earned an invite to the next Major's offline qualifier. All playoff matches were best-of-three, single elimination.

Map Pool
The map pool was changed for this major. Dust II was taken out of the active map pool and Valve reintroduced Inferno, which had been taken out of the map pool and revamped.

The veto process was also changed for best-of-one games. One team decided whether to veto maps first or second. The team that vetoes first removed two maps. The second team vetoed three maps. The first team then chose one of the two remaining maps. The second team then chose the side it wanted to start on. The best-of-three veto process was unchanged. Each team first banned a map, leaving a five-map pool. Each team then chose a map, with the opposing team selecting which side they wanted to start on for their opponent's map choice. The two map picks were the first two maps in the best-of-three. The teams then each banned one more map, leaving one map remaining for the best-of-three decider if necessary.

Major Qualifier

Regional Qualifiers

Asia Minor
A total of eight teams will compete in the Asia Minor. Two teams will be invited and the other six will qualify in their regional qualifiers. These teams include one team from East Asia, one team from the Middle East, one team from China, one team from Oceania, and two teams from the India & Southeast Asia qualifier.

CIS Minor
A total of eight teams will compete in the Commonwealth of Independent States Minor. The eight teams that participated in this minor all qualified through the closed qualifier. In the closed qualifier, twelve teams are invited and four teams qualify through an online open qualifier. Teams were separated into four groups of four and the top two teams moved on in each group to the closed qualifier. Two teams in the minor qualified for the main qualifier.

Europe Minor
All teams in the European Minor were required to compete in a closed qualifier. In the closed qualifier, 8 teams were invited and 8 other teams qualified through three different open qualifiers. The teams will play in a Swiss system tournament and the top 8 teams move on to the closed qualifier. In the closed qualifier, the teams will be separated into two groups of four teams. Two teams from each group move on to a four team, double elimination playoff bracket. The top three teams advance to the main qualifier.

Americas Minor
Two teams were invited to the Americas minor. One team out of a pool of 512 from South America qualified for the minor. The last five teams came from the North American closed qualifier. In that closed qualifier, 8 teams qualified through the open qualifier and 8 more teams were invited. The top five teams moved on to the Americas minor. In the minor, two teams moved on to the major.

Main Qualifier

Teams

The main qualifier was a sixteen-team Swiss-system tournament format in which, after the first round, teams only played other teams with the same win–loss record. Each match was best-of-one, and no team played another team twice. All teams played until they had either won or lost three games: any team with three wins advanced to the playoff stage, and any team with three losses was eliminated. The qualifier was played in Bucharest, Romania.

The Ninjas in Pyjamas, after missing its first ever major at ELEAGUE and failed to be Legends for the first time at ESL One Cologne 2016, failed to qualify for the major qualifier and the European Minor after losing to Finland's iGame.com in the first round, losing to Sweden's Red Reserve in second round, defeating Sweden's Epsilon eSports in the third round, and losing to Turkey's Space Soldiers in the fourth round, failing to attend its second straight major.

Broadcast Talent
Host
 Paul "ReDeYe" Chaloner
Interviewer
 Scott "SirScoots" Smith
Fluff
 Pala "Mantrousse" Gilroy Sen
Commentators
 James Bardolph
 Anders Blume
 Henry "HenryG" Greer
 Daniel "ddk" Kapadia
 Auguste "Semmler" Massonnat
 Matthew "Sadokist" Trivett
Analysts
 Chad "SPUNJ" Burchill
 Robin "Fifflaren" Johansson
 Joona "natu" Leppänen
 Jason "moses" O'Toole
 Janko "YNk" Paunović
Observers
 Heather "sapphiRe" Garozzo
 DJ "Prius" Kuntz

Broadcasts
All streams were broadcast on Twitch in various languages.

Teams Competing
The top eight teams from ELEAGUE Major 2017 (Legends) were joined by the eight teams from the main qualifier (Challengers).

Arguably the biggest change of the teams in the major was the "French shuffle," which was led by Nathan "NBK-" Schmitt and Richard "shox" Papillon. NBK-. Kenny "kennyS" Schrub and, Dan "apEX" Madesclaire left Team EnVyUs for G2 Esports to join shox and Alexandre "bodyy" Pianaro; in addition, former G2 AWPer Édouard "SmithZz" Dubourdeaux moved to the coaching position. The remaining two G2 players, Cédric "RpK" Guipouy and Adil "ScreaM" Benrlitom, left the team and joined Team EnVyUs.

Pre-major ranking
HLTV.org rank teams based on results of teams' performances. The rankings shown below reflect the July 10, 2017 rankings, the last before the Major.

1Change since July 3, 2017 ranking

2Peak and low since end of ELEAGUE Major.

Group stage
The group stage was a sixteen-team Swiss-system tournament in which, after the first round, teams only played other teams with the same win–loss record. Each match was best-of-one, and no team played another team twice. All teams played until they had either won or lost three games: any team with three wins advanced to the playoff stage, and any team with three losses was eliminated. The group stage and playoffs were played in Kraków, Poland, with group stage played in closed studio and playoffs being held in Tauron Arena Kraków.

First round seeding was determined by the following:

Teams that placed top four at the previous Major (Astralis, Virtus.pro, Fnatic, and SK Gaming) were first seeds
Teams that placed 5th-8th place at the previous Major (Natus Vincere, Gambit Esports, FaZe Clan, and North) were second seeds
Teams that placed first in the main qualifier (mousesports and G2 Esports) and the top two teams that placed third based on their seeds going into the major qualifier (BIG and Cloud9) were third seeds
The remaining teams (Immortals, FlipSid3 Tactics, PENTA Sports, and Vega Squadron) were fourth seeds

In the first round, first seeds played a randomly drawn fourth seed, and second seeds played a randomly drawn third seed. After this round, teams were randomly drawn against other teams with the same record (e.g., 1–0 teams against 1–0 teams, 0–1 teams against 0–1 teams). The eight teams to win three (out of a possible five) games were granted "Legend" status and an automatic invitation to the next Major.

Playoffs

Bracket
BIG and Gambit received the top seeds and played a randomly selected opponent among Virtus.pro, Immortals, and Fnatic. BIG received Immortals and Gambit received Fnatic. Among SK Gaming, North, and Astralis, two randomly selected teams from this pool would go on to face each other and the teams would be SK Gaming and Astralis. The remaining two teams, North and Virtus.pro, were paired together.

Quarterfinals

Gambit Esports vs. Fnatic

Casters: James Bardolph & ddk

SK Gaming vs. Astralis

Casters: Anders Blume & Semmler

BIG vs. Immortals

Casters: HenryG & Sadokist

North vs. Virtus.pro

Casters: Anders Blume & Semmler

Semifinals

Gambit Esports vs. Astralis

Casters: James Bardolph & ddk

Immortals vs. Virtus.pro

Casters: Sadokist & HenryG

Finals

Casters: Sadokist & HenryG

AdreN was named the MVP of the tournament.

Final standings
The final placings are shown below. Each team's in-game leader is shown first.

Post-Major Ranking
The first HLTV.org ranking after the PGL Major came out on July 24, 2017.

†Change since July 17, 2017 ranking

References

Counter-Strike: Global Offensive Majors
Esports competitions in Poland
2017 first-person shooter tournaments
Sports competitions in Kraków
International esports competitions hosted by Poland
Professional Gamers League competitions